is a passenger railway station located in the city of Tokorozawa, Saitama, Japan, operated by the private railway operator Seibu Railway.

Lines

Station layout
The station consists of a ground-level island platform serving two tracks. Stabling tracks lie on the down side of the station, which were formerly used by freight trains.

Platforms

History
The station opened on 15 April 1915, initially named . This was renamed  in August of the same year. The station was renamed Sayamagaoka from 1 March 1933.

Station numbering was introduced on all Seibu Railway lines during fiscal 2012, with Sayamagaoka Station becoming "SI20".

Passenger statistics
In fiscal 2019, the station was the 20th busiest on the Seibu network with an average of 25,107 passengers daily.  The passenger figures for previous years are as shown below.

Surrounding area

See also
 List of railway stations in Japan

References

External links

 Seibu station information 

Railway stations in Saitama Prefecture
Railway stations in Japan opened in 1915
Seibu Ikebukuro Line
Railway stations in Tokorozawa, Saitama